This list of English words with dual French and Old English variations lists various English words with redundant loanwords. After the Norman invasion of England in 1066 many of the more refined English (Old English) words describing finished products were replaced with words, borrowed from Anglo-Norman (such as "beef," a prepared food). In contrast, common unfinished equivalents continued to use the native English term (such as "cow," a living animal). This replacement can be explained by the fact that meat was an expensive product at the time and that the lord and nobleman of Norman origin were eating it more often than the commoners, who were raising the livestock. This duality is also mirrored in French, where "beef" is bœuf, but "cow" is vache. These dual words later formed the basis of the Middle English wordstock, and were eventually passed into the modern language.

In some cases, these dual variations are distant etymological twins, as in cow/beef, both from Proto-Indo-European *gʷōus, but in other cases, such as calf/veal, they come from distinct PIE roots.

Generally, words coming from French often retain a higher register than words of Old English origin, and they are considered by some to be more posh, elaborate, sophisticated, or pretentious. However, there are exceptions: weep, groom and stone (from Old English) occupy a slightly higher register than cry, brush and rock (from French). Words taken directly from Latin and Ancient Greek are generally perceived as colder, more technical, and more medical or scientific – compare life (Old English) with biology (classical compound – a modern coinage from Greek roots).

List of English words with dual Old English/Old French variations

Foods:

Other words:

Words now obsolete, archaic or dialectal:

See also
Lists of English loanwords by country or language of origin
List of English words of French origin
Changes to Old English vocabulary
List of Germanic and Latinate equivalents in English

References

French
Lists of English words of French origin